Gouin is a provincial electoral district in the Montreal region of the province of Quebec, Canada that elects members to the National Assembly of Quebec. It consists of part of the Rosemont–La Petite-Patrie borough of Montreal. The riding covers the neighbourhoods of La Petite-Patrie and Parc Molson, plus a small part of Vieux-Rosemont.

It was created for the 1966 election from parts of Montréal-Laurier and Montréal–Jeanne-Mance.

Its territory was unchanged during the switch from the 2001 to the 2011 electoral map.

It is named after former Quebec Premier, Lomer Gouin, who was in power from 1905 to 1920.

Members of the National Assembly

Linguistic demographics

Francophone: 78.1%
Anglophone: 4.7%
Allophone: 17.2%

Election results

* Result compared to Action démocratique

* Result compared to UFP

|-
 
|Liberal
|Edith Keays 
|align="right"|3,645  	  
|align="right"|24.32
|align="right"|-5.88
|-

|-

|-

|-

|Independent
|Régent Millette 
|align="right"|33
|align="right"|0.22
|align="right"|–
|-
|}

|-
 
|Liberal
|William Aguilar 
|align="right"|8,996
|align="right"|30.20
|align="right"|-2.42

|-

|-

|-

|-
|}

|-
  
|Liberal
|Michelle Daines 
|align="right"|10,273  	
|align="right"|33.62 
|align="right"|-2.06

|-
 
|Socialist Democracy
|Geneviève Ricard 
|align="right"|624  	
|align="right"|2.04  	 
|align="right"|-2.62
|-

|-

|-

|No designation
|Annette Kouri
|align="right"|61  	
|align="right"|0.20    	  	  	 
|align="right"|–
|}

|-
 
|Liberal
|Jean L’Abbé
|align="right"|10,490  	
|align="right"|45.34
|align="right"|+6.91
|-
 
|New Democratic
|Jacques Derosiers
|align="right"|665 	
|align="right"|2.87  	 
|align="right"|–
|-
 
|Parti indépendantiste
|Yvon J. Hachey
|align="right"|341 	
|align="right"|1.47 
|align="right"|–
|-

|Progressive Conservative
|Lorenzo Bonneau
|align="right"|181  	
|align="right"|0.78    	  	  	 
|align="right"|–
|-

|Humanist
|Hernani Da Costa
|align="right"|146  	
|align="right"|0.63  	  	 
|align="right"|–

|-

|Christian Socialist
|Jean-François Cloutier
|align="right"|51  	
|align="right"|0.22   	  	  	 
|align="right"|–
|-
|}

|-
 
|Liberal
|Jean Longpré
|align="right"|10,354  	
|align="right"|38.43
|align="right"|+4.82
|-

|-
 
|Workers' Communist
|Louise Baillargeon
|align="right"|159	
|align="right"|0.59 
|align="right"|–
|-

|-

|-

|Independent
|Lorenzo Bonneau
|align="right"|66  	
|align="right"|0.24   	  	  	 
|align="right"|–
|-

|United Social Credit
|Camille Marquis
|align="right"|48  	
|align="right"|0.18   	  	  	 
|align="right"|-2.79
|-
|}

|-
 
|Liberal
|Jean M. Beauregard
|align="right"|9,015  	
|align="right"|33.61
|align="right"|-14.47
|-

|-

|-

|Workers
|Céline Lenoir Boulanger 
|align="right"|94  	
|align="right"|0.35    	  	  	 
|align="right"|–
|-
 
|NDP – RMS coalition
|Wilbray Thiffault 
|align="right"|78	
|align="right"|0.29 
|align="right"|–
|-
|}

References

External links
Information
 Elections Quebec

Election results
 Election results (National Assembly)
 Election results (QuébecPolitique)

Maps
 2011 map  (PDF)
 2001 map (Flash)
2001–2011 changes  (Flash)
1992–2001 changes  (Flash)
 Electoral map of Montréal region
 Quebec electoral map, 2011

Provincial electoral districts of Montreal
Gouin
Rosemont–La Petite-Patrie